Aeromexpress was an all-cargo company based in Mexico City, Mexico. It operated air cargo services transporting general cargo, perishables, printed matter, live animals, works of art, securities and restricted products.

History 
The airline was established in 1990 and started operations on 9 June 1994. It was established to manage cargo operations for parent company Aeroméxico and also helped to manage cargo operations for Mexicana. It was owned by Grupo Aeroméxico (50%). It ceased operating as an airline in 2004 and continue operating as a cargo handler using Mexicana and Aeromexico fleet until Mexicana's bankruptcy and creation of Aerovías Empresa de Cargo (Aeromexico Cargo) as a wholly owned subsidiary of Grupo Aeroméxico in 2011.

Services 
Aeromexpress operated to/from every destination of Aeroméxico through the cargo compartments of the airlines' aircraft.

Fleet 
Aeroméxico fleet

Used many companies as contract or freight charter:

 Boeing 727-200F 
 ABX Air 767-200F 
 Cargolux 747-400F
 Aeromexico fleet

External links
Aeromexpress

References

Airlines of Mexico
Airlines established in 1990
1990 establishments in Mexico
Cargo airlines of Mexico
Aeroméxico